Good Losers is a British mystery play by Michael Arlen and Walter C. Hackett.

It was originally performed at the Whitehall Theatre in London's West End where it ran for 134 performances between 16 February and 13 June 1931. The original cast included Ian Hunter, Francis Lister, Ronald Shiner, Anthony Holles, Eric Maturin, Joan Marion, Marion Lorne and Cathleen Nesbitt. It was followed at the theatre soon after by another Hackett's plays, the horseracing farce Take a Chance.

References

Bibliography
 Wearing, J.P. The London Stage 1930-1939: A Calendar of Productions, Performers, and Personnel.  Rowman & Littlefield, 2014.

1931 plays
West End plays
Plays by Michael Arlen
Plays by Walter C. Hackett